Saribus is a genus of palms (family Arecaceae), native to Southeast Asia, Papuasia and Pacific Islands. They are fan palms, the leaves with an armed petiole terminating in a rounded, costapalmate fan of numerous leaflets.

Livistona is closely related to the genus Saribus, and for the past century and half Saribus was included in Livistona. Recent studies, however, have advocated separating the two groups. The generic epithet Saribus comes from a local name in one of the Maluku languages, sariboe, as recorded by the Dutch.

Anáhaw (Saribus rotundifolius) is the unofficial national leaf of the Philippines.

Species
 Saribus brevifolius (Dowe & Mogea) C.D.Bacon & W.J.Baker - Raja Ampat Islands in Indonesia
 Saribus chocolatinus (Dowe) C.D.Bacon & W.J.Baker - Papua New Guinea
 Saribus jeanneneyi (Becc.) C.D.Bacon & W.J.Baker - New Caledonia
 Saribus merrillii (Becc.) C.D.Bacon & W.J.Baker - Philippines
 Saribus papuanus (Becc.) Kuntze - Western New Guinea
 Saribus rotundifolius (Lam.) Mart. - Philippines, Sulawesi, Maluku, Raja Ampat Islands, Banggi Island in north-east Sabah
 Saribus surru (Dowe & Barfod) C.D.Bacon & W.J.Baker - Papua New Guinea
 Saribus tothur (Dowe & Barfod) C.D.Bacon & W.J.Baker - New Guinea
 Saribus woodfordii (Ridl.) C.D.Bacon & W.J.Baker - Papua New Guinea, Solomon Islands

References

External links
 
 

Arecaceae genera
Livistoninae